Silvia Toffanin (born 26 October 1979) is an Italian television host, model and journalist.

Education 
In 2007, Toffanin earned a degree in Foreign Languages and Literature from Catholic University of Milan.

Career 
In 1997, Toffanin was a contestant for  Miss Italia but did not win.

In 2000, Toffanin debuted in TV as one of the dancers in the Canale 5 quiz Passaparola, with Gerry Scotti (2000). Toffanin stayed in Passaparola until 2002, when she replaced Michelle Hunziker in the late night show Nonsolomoda; she hosted this show until 2009. In 2003 she presented Moda mare a Porto Cervo and then the Saturday afternoon show Mosquito, aired by Italia 1, until 2004.

In September 2006 Toffanin replaced Paola Perego in Verissimo, which in that year switched from the daily schedule to the Saturday afternoon. It is still aired by Canale 5.

After 2007, Toffanin became a professional journalist.

Personal life 
Since 2001 Toffanin's partner is Pier Silvio Berlusconi, who is the father of her son, Lorenzo Mattia (born 10 June 2010) and her daughter, Sofia Valentina (born 2015).

Filmography

Television
Passaparola (Canale 5, 2000–2002)
Nonsolomoda (Canale 5, 2002–2009)
Moda mare a Porto Cervo (Italia 1, 2003)
Mosquito (Italia 1, 2003–2004)
Verissimo (Canale 5, 2006 – )

References

External links

Living people
1979 births
Italian television presenters
Italian women television presenters
People from Marostica